The James A. Blakeney House is a historic house located near Providence, Mecklenburg County, North Carolina. It was built in 1905–1906, and is a two-story, three-bay, Colonial Revival style frame farmhouse with a one-story rear kitchen wing. It has a multiple cross-gable slate roof and a broad hip roofed wraparound porch. Also on the property is a contributing well house.

It was listed on the National Register of Historic Places on June 18, 1998.

References

Houses on the National Register of Historic Places in North Carolina
Colonial Revival architecture in North Carolina
Houses completed in 1906
Houses in Charlotte, North Carolina
National Register of Historic Places in Mecklenburg County, North Carolina
1906 establishments in North Carolina